Sefronia is the eighth album by singer-songwriter Tim Buckley, released in September 1973.

Production
The album was produced by Denny Randell. It was recorded at Paramount Recording Studios in Los Angeles, California. Other tracks were recorded at Record Plant, in New York, and at Devonshire Sound Studios in North Hollywood.

Critical reception
AllMusic wrote that Buckley's "voice isn't as stunning as usual on his next-to-last album, but the bigger problem is the material, which is usually forced and pedestrian." Trouser Press wrote: "Denny Randell’s anachronistic-on-impact LA white-soul production, which pours syrupy strings over several numbers, is hardest to digest on poorly chosen middle-of-the-road love songs that didn’t suit Buckley at all." NME declared that the album is "widely agreed to be Buckley’s most over-produced and underwhelming effort."

Track listing

Side One
"Dolphins" (Fred Neil) – 3:10
"Honey Man" (Larry Beckett, Tim Buckley) – 4:10
"Because of You" (Beckett, Buckley) – 4:25
"Peanut Man" (Fred Freeman, Harry Nehls) – 2:52
"Martha" (Tom Waits) – 3:10

Side Two
"Quicksand" (Buckley) – 3:22
"I Know I'd Recognize Your Face" (Letty Jo Baron, Denny Randell) – 3:58
"Stone In Love" (Buckley) – 3:27
"Sefronia: After Asklepiades, After Kafka" (Beckett, Buckley) – 3:15
"Sefronia: The King's Chain" (Beckett, Buckley) – 2:23
"Sally, Go 'Round the Roses" (Lona Stevens, Zell Sanders) – 3:43

Personnel
Tim Buckley – guitar, vocals
Lee Underwood – guitar
Joe Falsia – guitar
Bob Rafkin – guitar
Marcia Waldorf, Sharon Beard, Myrna Matthews, Lisa Roberts – backing vocals
Bernie Mysior – bass guitar
Reinhold Press – bass guitar
Mark Tiernan – keyboards
Denny Randell – keyboards, producer, arrangements
Tom Scott – tenor saxophone
Fred Selden – flute
Earl Dumler – English horn
Larry Bunker – percussion
King Errisson – percussion, congas, tambourine
Ken Watson – percussion, timpani
Buddy Helm – drums
David Blumberg – string arrangements
Technical
Greg Venable, Kerry McNabb, Larry Hirsch, Roger Dollarhide, Roy Cicala – engineers
Cal Schenkel – art direction
Ed Caraeff – cover photography

References

Tim Buckley albums
1973 albums